Michael Aikman may refer to:

 Michael Aikman (rower) (1933–2005), Australian rower
 Michael Aikman (politician) (1797–1881), businessman and political figure in Upper Canada